Shirang-e Sofla (also Romanized as Shīrang-e Soflá; also known as Shīrang-e Pā’īn) is a village in Shirang Rural District, Kamalan District, Aliabad County, Golestan Province, Iran. At the 2006 census, its population was 393, in 103 families.

References 

Populated places in Aliabad County